Beylik of Erzincan was a principality in East Anatolia, Turkey in the fourteenth and early fifteenth centuries.

Background 

After the battle of Kösedağ in 1243, Ilkhanid Mongols became the de facto rulers of Anatolia. However, after Ilkhanids disintegrated in the fourteenth century, former generals and bureaucrats of Ilkhanids as well as tribes under Ilkhanid yoke declared independence.  The beylik of Erzincan was one of them.

Emergence of the beylik 

Erzincan was an east frontier town of the beylik of Eretna. Pir Hüseyin, the governor of the city died in 1379 and a certain Mutaharten (also known as Trata or Tahirten) replaced him. His origin is obscure. But probably he was of Uyghur origin and a relative of the bey of Eretnids. (Uyghurs served as bureaucrats in Mongol states.)  After the interregnum in Eretnids in 1380, he declared independence. However, after Kadi Burhanettin declared himself as the ruler of the former Eretnid territory in 1381, Mutaherten saw himself in a difficult situation; for all of his neighbours, namely dominions of Burhanettin, Empire of Trebizond, Kingdom of Georgia, Sultanate of Akkoyunlu (White sheep Turkmens) etc.  were more powerful than his small principality. So he adopted a policy of intrigue to protect the independency.

Mutaherten's last years 

Burhanettin died in 1398. But Ottoman sultan Beyazit I annexed the former Eretnid territory to his realm and began threatening the beylik of Eretna. Timur’s invasion of Anatolia at the beginning of the fifteenth century was a brief period of relief for Mutaherten who readily accepted the suzerainty of Timur. But shortly after the Battle of Ankara in 1402, victorious Timur left Anatolia.  The next year Mutaherten died.

Last years of the beylik
After his death the beylik ceased to play any role in the affairs of Anatolia. According to Ruy Gonzáles de Clavijo, a Spanish envoy to Timur, Mutaherten's nephew Ali tried to succeed him. But Mutaherten's son (whose name is not known) was able to ascend to throne. In 1410, Şeyh Hasan, Mutaherten's grandson was the ruler of the city. But Kara Yusuf, the sultan of Kara Koyunlu, captured Erzincan and put an end to the beylik.

References 

Anatolian beyliks
States in medieval Anatolia
States and territories established in 1279
History of Erzincan Province